Suden uni ("Wolf's Dream") is the first full-length album by Finnish pagan metal band Moonsorrow. It was originally released in 2001, and then re-released in 2003 with one bonus track (a Finnish lyrics version of the traditional Swedish song "Kom nu gubbar"), different cover art, and a 40-minute DVD.

Track listing

Personnel
 Ville Sorvali - vocals, bass, handclaps, choir
 Marko Tarvonen - drums, timpani, 12-string, vocals (backing), handclaps, choir
 Henri Sorvali - choir, guitars, keyboards, vocals (clean), accordion, mouth harp, handclaps

Guest musicians
 Robert Lejon - handclaps on "Tulkaapa äijät!"
 Stefan Lejon - handclaps on "Tulkaapa äijät!"
 Blastmor - handclaps
 Avather - handclaps
 Janne Perttilä - choir, handclaps

Production
 Mika Jussila - remastering
 Ahti "Pirtu" Kortelainen - recording, mixing, mastering
 Niklas Sundin - reissue cover art

2001 debut albums
Moonsorrow albums